Pretty Rhythm: Aurora Dream is a 2011 anime series and the first entry in the Pretty Rhythm animated franchise. The series includes Rizumu, Serena, and Kanon, characters from the original Pretty Rhythm: Mini Skirt arcade game, as well as Aira, a new character developed for the Pretty Rhythm: Aurora Dream edition of the game. After the series' end, the characters make appearances in other Pretty Series spin-offs.

Main characters

MARs 
MARs (an acronym for its members) is a Prism Star unit composed of Aira Harune, Rizumu Amamiya, and Mion Takamine. 

Aira is 14 years old and a second-year middle school student scouted by Jun to be a Prism Star. She is clumsy and non-athletic, but she is very optimistic and considerate of others. Aira's strongest suit is fashion and has the ability to hear the "voices" of clothing. She is a fan of Prism Stone, a store run by Shō from Callings, whom Aira also has a crush on. Her catchphrase is "Happy, lucky!"

In Dear My Future, Aira is 18 years old and a third-year high school student. At the end of Dear My Future, she becomes a designer for Prism Stone.

As a Prism Star, Aira performs to the song "Dream Goes On."

Rizumu is 14 years old and a second-year middle student attending the same school as Aira. Despite having horrible grades, she is very good at dancing and attends a dance school for Prism Stars called Pretty Top. Rizumu is dedicated to performing and is the daughter of the legendary Prism Queen, Sonata Kanzaki, who disappeared after performing "Aurora Rising". Rizumu hopes to perform the same jump as the next Prism Queen, believing that it will bring her mother back. Rizumu is romantically interested in Hibiki, and as a result, she easily becomes jealous of any girl who seemingly displays an interest in him; the two marry in Dear My Future. Her catchphrase is "I'm full of energy!"

In Dear My Future, Rizumu is 18 years old and a third-year high school student.

As a Prism Star, Rizumu performs to the song "Kokoro no Juden".

Mion is 14 years old and a popular idol and model. At an early age, she traveled the world with her parents, but she is currently living alone in Japan and feels lonely without them. Initially dismissive of Prism Shows, Mion becomes motivated to perform when she sees Aira and Rizumu perform in the Tiara Cup and eventually befriends them. Mion is in love with Jun. Her catchphrase is "Mion, switch on!"
In Dear My Future, Mion is 19 years old.

As a Prism Star, Mion performs to the song "Switch On My Heart".

Recurring characters

Pretty Top 

Jun is a 24-year-old associate at Pretty Top who can see "star aura", leading him to scout Aira and Rizumu. He believes that Aira, Rizumu, and Mion were destined to be together. Jun often gives advice in allegories despite Aira and Rizumu not understanding him. Later in the series, Jun is revealed to be Kyōko's adoptive brother, as her mother adopted him as her own son after his parents died in an accident. He proposes to her during Hibiki and Rizumu's wedding.

Kyoko is the 34-year-old president of Pretty Top set on making profits. She is a former Prism Star who once competed against Rizumu's mother, Sonata Kanzaki, and lost after being unable to perform "Aurora Rising". Her Prism Jump called "Platinum Spiral", inspired Sonata to become a Prism Star.

Yamao is the manager of Pretty Top's dance school. He carries Penguin-sensei on his shoulder, and the only thing he says is, "I am Yamada". In Pretty Rhythm: Rainbow Live, he has a spin-off character named Tanaka.

Callings 
Callings is a Prism Star unit composed of Sho, Hibiki, and Wataru, who are all first-year high school students. Their Prism Act is "Super Galaxy Love" and their song is "Eien no Bigaku."

Sho is the leader of Callings, as well as the designer and manager of Prism Stone, Aira's favorite clothing store. Impressed by Aira's fashion sense, he falls in love with her and teases her occasionally but decides not to act on his feelings as long as he is in Callings. Sho gives Aira advice from time to time, although there are times where he is quick to lose his temper. He, like Mion, is afraid of dark places.
In Dear My Future, Sho is 20 years old.

Hibiki is a member of Callings who enjoys teasing Rizumu. His younger sister is Kanon.

Wataru is a member of Callings. Despite his youthful appearance, he is insightful about other people's feelings and attempts to get Mion to open up to people around her.

Prism World 

Mega-nee is the one in charge of the star coordinator where all Prism Stars go to get changed.

Penguin Teacher is a teacher at Pretty Top. He sits on top of Yamada's shoulders and is very awkward in Aira, Rizumu and Mion's eyes. In Pretty Rhythm: Rainbow Live, it is revealed that he was June's partner in the past, before the events of the series and before he left her and became the teacher at Pretty Top. In the final episode, he falls into the Mascot Hell as a punishment given him by Peacock.

Sere-non With Kaname 
In Episode 39 of Pretty Rhythm: Dear My Future, they were called Serenon with K. They were also trying to get MARs back from the "Symphonia Company", but they lost. They and ended up moving to the "Symphonia Company" along with Serenon with K. They returned to "Pretty Top" in Episode 42. Their unit song in Aurora Dream is called "Never Let Me Down", which was first heard in Episode 21.

 

Serena is a character introduced later in the story. Her father, Steven, is a French businessman, and her mother, Karen, is Japanese, from Kyoto. She seems to be very hot headed and can not stand being bored. She loves to dance and perform comedy skits with her best friend, Kanon Tōdō. Serena is also very competitive and strives to win over MARs. She speaks the Kawachi dialect in Osaka Japanese. She has short light yellow hair and blue eyes. She and Kanon defeated Aira and Rizumu in the Summer Queen Cup, which she likes to brag about to the three, especially Mion, whom she sees as a rival. Serena always tries to challenge MARs every time they meet face to face. Despite this, she is shown to be a big supporter of them. Serena's song is called "Wonderful World" which was first heard in Episode 45. In the future, she and Kanon became a professional manzai duo (mainly the Bokke).

Serena's Prism Jump in Dear My Future is "Space Screw Spiral" (Episode 36).

 

Kanon is a character introduced later in the story with Serena. She is usually very elegant and reserved, with her brown hair and light brown eyes. However, when it comes to Hibiki, she gets fired up to stop competition for his affection. She and Rizumu had a rivalry over him, while Rizumu did not know that Kanon was actually his younger sister which she (along with the rest of MARs) found out in Episode 24. She has a brother complex, although Hibiki is unaware of this. Kanon is from Kyoto while Hibiki is not but continues to come and make sure Rizumu and Hibiki do not become a couple. She is always seen performing comedy duos with Serena. Kanon's song is called "Don't Give Up" which was first heard in Episode 47. In the future, she and Serena became a professional manzai duo (mainly the Tsukkomi).

 

Kaname is a mysterious girl who joined Serena and Kanon in the Crystal High Heel Cup. She has also performed the Aurora Rising, but it was a darker version. Even so, she takes a liking to Aira. To get to know people better, she touches their hearts, smells them, and/or even licks them. She calls Sonata her mom. In Episode 51, Kaname is seen living with Rizumu and her parents. She even shares a very similar personality to Rizumu's. Kaname came from a circus in Russia and likes to eat bananas. In the last episode of Pretty Rhythm: Dear My Future, Kaname goes on a trip to find her real parents, whom she finally meets in the future. Kaname's song is called "Shall We Go?" which was first heard in Episode 42.

Pair Cheers 

Rabbit-chi is Aira's partner, a pink rabbit. He is good at Japanese comedy.

Bear-chi is Rizumu's partner, a brown bear.

Neko-chi is Mion's partner, a purple and grey cat. At first she is selfish like Mion, but later in the series she opens up to the others.

Minor characters

Family 
 

Aira's father. He is also the owner and pâtissiere of "Haru no Soraoto" cake shop. He is very protective of Aira, especially when she is around boys or when she first started to do Prism Shows and constantly buys clothes that Aira doesn't like.

 

Aira's mother. She was the former Prism Star Stylist of Kanzaki Sonata and is good friends with Rizumu's family. She is always the one to understand Aira and help her in her troubled times with her father.

 

Aira's younger sister and Eru's twin sister. She is five years old. She helped Aira keep her secret from her dad. She and her sister Eru love frilly dresses, unlike Aira.

 

Aira's younger sister and Uru's twin sister. She is five years old. She helped Aira in keeping her secret from dad. She and her sister Uru love frilly dresses, unlike Aira.
 * 
Aira's younger brother. He might be around 10 years old. He pretends to be the most mature in whole family and loves teasing aira every time. But deep down he loves her a lot.

Rizumu's Family:

 

Sonata is the Legendary Prism Queen who performed the Aurora Rising, twelve years before Aurora Dream started. She disappeared suddenly after saying she had not completed the Aurora Rising. It was said that she lost her memory after she got out of the hospital. She is Rizumu's mother and Amamiya Ryutaro's wife. She was very good friends with Aira's mother, Omi Harune and President Kyōko. She is Kaname Chris's coach helping her to perfect her Aurora Rising. It is later revealed in a flashback that she met Chris Kaname in a circus in Russia. Sonata gave her a banana, seeing that Kaname might be hungry. Then they started performing at the circus, until one night Sonata asked Kaname a favor. Sonata wanted Kaname to learn and perfect the Aurora Rising. Kaname agreed even though she did not know what the jump is. Sonata smiles which made Kaname smile, saying that she finally saw her smile outside the circus. She is the one who made Andy, Rizumu's beloved stuffed bear.

 

Amamiya Ryutaro is Rizumu's father, and also Sonata's husband, and by the series' end, Kaname's adoptive father. He once wanted to become a superstar, which is reflected in his current attire. Because of Sonata's rising success, he had to quit and became a home-maker instead. He is still very hurt by Sonata's leaving the house when the story begins, and protects his daughter at all costs to make sure the same trauma does not happen to her.

Mion's Family:

 

Anna Takamine is Mion's mother, and Pietro Takamine's wife. She plays a small role in Pretty Rhythm:Aurora Dream, but helps Mion find how to shine for her new Prism Jump by giving her some advice. She often had to leave Mion alone, as both she and Pietro were always on the move due to business. However, they both dearly love their daughter. She is a very energetic person, and will not hold back to jump. She has some puppy-like tendencies.

 

Mion's father and Anna Takamine's husband. He plays a small role in Pretty Rhythm: Aurora Dream, but helps Mion learn how to shine for her new Prism Jump by giving her some advice. Pietro Takamine often had to leave Mion alone, as both he and Anna were always on the move due to business. However, they both dearly love their daughter.

Serena's family:

 

Steven Jounouchi is the father of Prism Star Serena Jounouchi and Karen Jounouchi's husband. He is also the president of the Jounouchi Group. Although usually a very energetic businessman, he is extremely intimidated by his wife who often phones him to voice her complaints.

 Karen Jounouchi
Karen Jounouchi is the mother of Prism Star Serena Jounouchi Steven Jounouchi's wife. She is never seen on screen and her voice is never heard, but is known to be very intimidating, as she is feared by her husband. She voices her complaints to her husband at any time by calling him and his security team.

Other Characters 

Flare is the main character of the manga adaptation of Pretty Rhythm: Aurora Dream and makes a cameo in episode 31 of the anime series. She is a middle school student who recently transferred to Yokohama. She is a budding fashion designer and a fan of Prism Stone.

 

Kei is revealed to be Sonata's coach when she was aiming to do the Aurora Rising. She later trained Rizumu. She is also Kyōko's mother, and Jun's adoptive mother. She divorced Kyōko's father because of his obsession with the Grateful Symphonia. She used to be a Prism Star herself.

 

Asechi is the boss of the "Symphonia Company", the creator of the Symphonia Series, Romantic Night Wedding and the Pure White Wedding. He is obsessed with Grateful Symphonia and is willing to do anything for it. Kintaro is also known as the world's top designer. He is later revealed to be Kintaro Asechi, Kyōko's father and Kei's divorced husband. In episode 25, he cooks for Kyoko as a final goodbye before he fully loses his memories of his daughter. In episode 50 he finally recovers and regains all of his memory and his good side back.

References

Pretty Rhythm
Pretty Rhythm